The Moon is Earth's only natural satellite.

Moon may also refer to:

Celestial bodies
 Natural satellite or Moon (generic)
Moon, a Chinese asterism corresponding to 37 Tauri

Fictional entities
 Moon (Transformers), a character in Beast Wars II
 Moon, a fictional character on Jim Henson's Pajanimals
 Moon, a character in the Tom Stoppard play The Real Inspector Hound
 Moon, a DLC 4 Zombies map for Call of Duty: Black Ops 
 Moon, a Zombies map remastered version for part of the DLC 5 Zombies Chronicles for Call of Duty: Black Ops III
 The Moon, a recurring character from The Mighty Boosh

Film and television
 "Moon", an episode of Teletubbies
 Moon (2009 film), a 2009 science fiction film starring Sam Rockwell
 Moon (2020 film), a 2020 short drama film directed by Zoé Pelchat

Games
 Moon: Remix RPG Adventure, a role-playing game for the PlayStation
 Moon (1997 video game), a Japanese adult visual novel video game
 Moon (2009 video game), a first-person shooter video game for the Nintendo DS

Literature 
 Al-Qamar or The Moon, the 54th sura of the Qur'an
 Moon Publications, a series of travel guides by Avalon Publishing Group
 "Moon", a horror story by James Herbert
 "The Moon", a poem by Robert Louis Stevenson from A Child's Garden of Verses

Music
 The Moon, a psychedelic rock band featuring David Marks

Albums
 Moon (Gackt album) (2002)
 Moon (Kyoko Fukada album)
 "Moon" (EP), an EP by Kumi Koda
 Moon (Steve Lacy album)
 Moon (Snowbird album) (2014)
 Moon (Kenny Wheeler and John Taylor album) (2001)

Songs
 "Moon" (Björk song), 2011
 "Moon" (BTS song), 2020
 "Moon" ((G)I-dle song), 2021
 "Moon" (Kanye West song), 2021
 "Moon"/"Blossom", by Ayumi Hamasaki, 2010
 "The Moon" (song), by Taxi, 2000
 "Moon", by Chon from Grow, 2015
 "Moon", by Macintosh Plus from Floral Shoppe, 2012
 "Moon", by Turnstile from Time & Space, 2018
 "The Moon", by Cat Power from The Greatest, 2006
 "The Moon", by The Microphones from The Glow Pt. 2, 2001
 "The Moon", by The Swell Season from The Swell Season, 2006

People
 Moon (given name)
 Moon (Korean name)
 Moon (surname)
 Moon (gamer) (born 1986), South Korean professional gamer
 Di "Moon" Zhang, Chinese-American member of I.aM.mE

Places
France
 Moon-sur-Elle, a commune in France
United States
 Moon, Kentucky, an unincorporated community 
 Moon Township, Pennsylvania
 Moon, South Dakota, a ghost town
 Moon, Virginia
 Moon, Wisconsin, an unincorporated community

Other uses
 The Moon (Tarot card)
Moon (astrology)
 FreeX Moon, a German paraglider design
 Moon Motor Car, a United States automotive company
 Moon type, a writing system for the blind
 Mooning, the act of displaying bare buttocks for insult or shock value
 Malibu Moon (1997–2021), American thoroughbred horse

See also
 Luna (disambiguation)
 Lunar month, or one revolution of the Moon around the Earth
 Moon River (disambiguation)
 Moonflower (disambiguation)
 Moonmoon, a "moon of a moon"
 Moonshine, an alcoholic beverage